Sam Williams (born March 18, 2005) is an American soccer player who plays as a midfielder for USL Championship side New York Red Bulls II via the New York Red Bulls academy.

Club career
As part of the New York Red Bulls academy, Williams appeared for New York Red Bulls II in the USL Championship as an injury-time substitute on July 3, 2021 against Miami FC. On July 15, 2022, during a 1-0 victory over Indy Eleven, Williams became the first New York Red Bulls academy player to log more than 2,000 minutes for Red Bull II.

Career statistics

Club

References

2005 births
Living people
American soccer players
Association football midfielders
New York Red Bulls II players
USL Championship players